Karolína Mališová (born 9 November 1996) is a Czech model and beauty pageant titleholder who was crowned Česká Miss Earth 2015 and represented the Czech Republic at Miss Earth 2015. Karolína won alongside Nikol Svantnerova and Andrea Kalousová who are Czech Republic's representative to Miss Universe 2015 and Miss World 2015 pageants, respectively. She was crowned by predecessor, Nikola Buranská.

Pageantry

Česká Miss 2015
Karolína won Česká Miss for Miss Earth pageant on 28 March 2015 she also won Best Face and Best Smile.

Miss Earth 2015
Karolína competed at Miss Earth 2015 and placed Top 16.

References

External links
Karolína Mališová at Czechoslovak Models

Czech beauty pageant winners
1996 births
People from Opava District
Czech female models
Living people
Miss Earth 2015 contestants